Eric Steel is an American filmmaker and producer, best known for his controversial 2006 documentary The Bridge.

Career

The Bridge
Steel's directorial debut was the 2006 documentary The Bridge. After reading about efforts to place a suicide barrier on the Golden Gate Bridge, one of the world's most often used venues for suicide, he had the bridge filmed from multiple locations throughout 2004, to obtain footage of actual suicides. In obtaining permits to film the bridge, Steel did not reveal to bridge officials that his goal was to film people committing suicide. Instead he stated that his purpose was to make a film "exploring the beauty and mystique of the Golden Gate Bridge". A number of suicides were captured on film. The resulting footage was combined with interviews with family and friends of the victims, along with other witnesses.

Filmography

As producer
Bringing Out the Dead (1999)
Angela's Ashes (1999)
Shaft (2000)
Julie & Julia (2009)

As director
The Bridge (2006)
Kiss the Water (2013)
Minyan (2020)

External links

American film directors
American film producers
Yale University alumni
Living people
Year of birth missing (living people)